The Legends Ike & Tina Turner Live in '71 is a live video album released by Eagle Vision in 2004. Its two disc package featuring a concert in the Netherlands during the pinnacle of Ike & Tina Turner's career. Also included is an hour-long CD of the concert with three additional songs. The "Soul To Soul" music video from the 1971 Soul To Soul concert in Ghana is included as a bonus feature.

Recording 
The concert was filmed at the Kurhaus Scheveningen in Den Hague for Dutch television VPRO on February 11, 1971.

Critical reception 

Reviewing Live In '71 for AllMusic, Richie Unterberger wrote: "As a document of an exciting rock 'n' soul revue, it's pretty good, well-shot, and in restored color. The chief pleasure might be more visual than musical (although the soundtrack is in good shape as well), as Tina Turner and the three backing Ikettes go through their choreographed paces with earthy sensuality."

Steve LaBate wrote for Paste magazine: "The Revue rocks full throttle—from the band’s soulful instrumental take on Buddy Miles' 'Them Changes' and the Ikettes' spunky, short-skirted entrance to Tina’s gritty, revved-up soul belting. Today's TRL pop icons take heed: this video is undeniable proof you can dance your ass off without having to lip sync."

Track listing

References 

Live video albums
2004 video albums
2004 live albums
Ike & Tina Turner video albums
Ike & Tina Turner live albums